The 1999 IAAF World Race Walking Cup was held on 1 and 2 May 1999 in the streets of Mézidon-Canon, France.  From this year on, there was no combined men's team trophy (Lugano Trophy), just the separate standings for the two races, and the women's team trophy was no longer called "Eschborn Cup" as before with their distance being increased from 10 km to 20 km.

Detailed reports on the event and an appraisal of the results was given for the IAAF.

Complete results were published.

Medallists

Results

Men's 20 km

Team (20 km Men)

Men's 50 km

Team (50 km Men)

Women's 20 km

Team (20km Women)

Participation
The participation of 372 athletes (249 men/123 women) from 57 countries is reported.

 (10/5)
 (6/5)
 (1/-)
 (-/1)
 (1/1)
 (1*/1)
 (3/5)
 (3/-)
 (10/5)
 (2/-)
 (1*/-)
 (7/-)
 (7/-)
 (1/2)
 (1/1)
 (-/1)
 (2/-)
 (4/3)
 (10/5)
 (9/4)
 (2/-)
 (2/3)
 (3/2)
 (8/5)
 (4/-)
 (3/3)
 (10/5)
 (5/2)
 (4/3)
 (2/1)
 (3/2)
 (1/-)
 (4/1)
 (-/3)
 (10/5)
 (1/-)
 (4/-)
 (1/1)
 (1/3)
 (1/-)
 (9/2)
 (9/3)
 (3/1)
 (3/3)
 (10/5)
 (4*/-)
 (10/-)
 (4/1)
 (10/5)
 (7/3)
 (8/3)
 (1/-)
 (3/1)
 (-/4)
 (10/5)
 (10/5)
 (1/1)
 Yugoslavia (1/-)
 (-/2)

*: Athletes announced in the official start list, but did not show.

See also
 1999 Race Walking Year Ranking

References

External links
Official site - IAAF.org
Results - IAAF.org

World Athletics Race Walking Team Championships
World Race Walking Cup
World Race Walking Cup
World Race Walking Cup